Frederic Hill (29 June 1803 – 1896) was a prison inspector in Scotland and England, and a social and economic reformer.

Biography
Frederic Hill was born at Hilltop, a house at the summit of Gough Street, Birmingham, the sixth child of Thomas Wright Hill and Sarah, his wife, whose maiden name was Lea. He was educated in the small school run by his father, becoming an assistant teacher there at the age of thirteen.

In 1819 the family moved from Birmingham to Edgbaston and a bigger, better school which they named ‘Hazelwood’. Frederic became involved with the movement for political reform with his brothers, Rowland, who would introduce the Penny Post, and Matthew, who would become an MP for Hull. The people were not represented by Parliament, but only a section of the ruling class, mainly the land-owning aristocracy. Political Unions were set up all around the country to press for change and Frederic became a prominent member of the Birmingham Union. As a result of this pressure the Reform Bill of 1832 was passed.

Two years later Frederic obtained the post of parliamentary secretary to Mr. Sergeant Wilde (afterwards Lord Truro). As part of his brief he had to provide his employer with accurate information on any subject on which he intended to speak. In 1835 the Duke of Richmond introduced into Parliament a Bill to appoint Inspectors of Prisons, four for England and one for Scotland. Frederic Hill decided to apply.

“Well do I remember the arrival of the letter from Lord John Russell,” Frederic wrote many years later, “informing me that I was appointed an inspector of prisons. I was sitting reading in Matthew’s chambers in Chancery Lane, and such was my delight that I skipped about the room for joy, and, tradition says, jumped over a chair!”

His complete ignorance on the subject of prisons proved to be no barrier to his appointment as inspector. He was told by the Home Secretary that Scotland had been “[chosen] as your chief district because there is most work to be done there and I know you will do it.” The counties of Northumberland and Durham were also to be under his supervision.

Frederic Hill realized that he needed advice before jumping into the stormy seas of the Scottish prison system. He visited Elizabeth Fry who, with her brother, Joseph Gurney, had written a book about the state of Scottish prisons in 1819. She thought the summary of their findings was still applicable.

Upon his arrival in Scotland, Frederic found the condition of most prisoners worse than expected. They had dirty straw for bedding, unglazed windows, cold, damp cells and were “herded together, young and old, good or bad, without any distinction as to their various offences, and were left to corrupt one another. No work was provided, and they passed their time in idleness, drunkenness and gambling.”

Hill made various suggestions to Lord John Russell, one of the most important being that the management of all the prisons in Scotland should be placed under one directing authority. As a result of this recommendation, the Act of 1839 appointed a Board of Directors of Prisons “invested with Power to Erect and maintain proper Prisons, and regulate the Discipline and Management of all Prisons in Scotland, and for raising the necessary Funds by means of a general Assessment on Property within the several Counties and Burghs in manner hereinafter provided.”

A new regime was about to begin throughout the Scottish prison system and Frederic Hill was at the heart of it. 1839 was an exciting year for him as it was then he met his future wife, Martha Cowper. She was as concerned about social reform as Frederic and took a great interest in his work as a Prison Inspector. They married in 1840 beginning, as he later recorded, “nearly fifty years of uninterrupted connubial happiness.”

In 1847, after twelve years in Scotland, Frederic applied to be an inspector of English prisons. His district encompassed the whole of the north of England and North Wales. He was immediately faced with a system that had seen little in the way of reform and where several governors were unfit for their posts. Although he pressed for change he found a great resistance to his ideas and became dispirited. His brother, Rowland, asked him to accept the post of assistant secretary at the Post Office, an offer which was timely and gratefully received. He moved to Hampstead with his wife and two daughters, Constance and Ellen. Although no longer an inspector of prisons, Frederic retained an interest, connecting himself with the Law Amendment Society, the Metropolitan Discharged Prisoners’ Aid Society and the Reform and Refuge Union.

Frederic Hill retired from public life in 1876, though he still retained a lively interest in various societies and charitable committees.

Works
 National Education, its Present State and Prospects, 1836
 Crime, its Amount, Causes and Remedies, 1853
 Frederic Hill, an autobiography, edited by Constance Hill, 1894

External links

1803 births
1896 deaths
British prison inspectors